The Clorinde-class submarines were built for the French Navy prior to World War I. There were two boats in this class, neither of them would be used during World War I, but they operated in the Atlantic Ocean and the English Channel until they were stricken in 1926.

Construction 
The Clorinde-class submarines were both built at Arsenal de Rochefort in November 1910, they were double-hulled submarines and built under the 1909 programme Project of Julien Hutter on the basis of Labeuf Brumaire. They were launched in 1913 and the first submarine Clorinde was completed in October 1916, while her sistership Cornélie was finished in September 1917.

They had 2 MAN-Loire diesels / 2 NANCY-electric motors which were powered by diesel oil and the engine was rated at 800 nhp. They each also held a single  deck gun which was installed in 1916 when they entered service.

Ships

Notes

Bibliography

 

Submarine classes
World War I submarines of France
Ship classes of the French Navy